Alessandro Paparoni (born 17 August 1981) is an Italian volleyball player. He is a gold medalist of European Championship 2005. Paparoni competed for Italy at the 2008 Summer Olympics. He has been playing for Lube Banca Macerata since 2013.

Career

Clubs

Sporting achievements

Clubs

CEV Champions League
  2001/2002 – with Lube Banca Macerata

CEV Cup
  2000/2001 – with Lube Banca Macerata
  2004/2005 – with Lube Banca Macerata
  2005/2006 – with Lube Banca Macerata

CEV Challenge Cup
  2010/2011 – with Lube Banca Macerata

National championships
 2000/2001  Italian Cup, with Lube Banca Macerata
 2005/2006  Italian SuperCup, with Lube Banca Macerata
 2005/2006  Italian Championship, with Lube Banca Macerata
 2007/2008  Italian Cup, with Lube Banca Macerata
 2013/2014  Italian Championship, with Lube Banca Macerata

National team

CEV European Championships
  2005 Italy/Serbia

References

External links

 
 
 

1981 births
Living people
Sportspeople from the Province of Macerata
Italian men's volleyball players
Olympic volleyball players of Italy
Volleyball players at the 2008 Summer Olympics
21st-century Italian people